

Administrative and municipal divisions

References

Geography of Mari El
Mari El